"Shoeshine Man" is a song written and recorded by American country music artist Tom T. Hall. It was released in March 1970 as the fourth and final single from the album, Homecoming. The song peaked at number 8 on the U.S. country singles chart and at number 10 on the Canadian country singles chart. The rockabilly number tells the story of a shoe-shining harmonica player in Montgomery, Alabama, who professes to be "number one in the land."

Chart performance

References 
 

1970 singles
Tom T. Hall songs
Songs written by Tom T. Hall
Song recordings produced by Jerry Kennedy
Mercury Records singles